Lozovoye is a rural locality (a selo) in Kustanayevsky Selsoviet of Belogorsky District, Amur Oblast, Russia. The population was 2 as of 2018. There is 1 street.

Geography 
Lozovoye is located 27 km southwest of Belogorsk (the district's administrative centre) by road. Kustanayevka is the nearest rural locality.

References 

Rural localities in Belogorsky District